Delmer is an unincorporated community in Pulaski County, Kentucky, United States.

History
A post office, now closed, was established in 1903 and named for the first postmaster's infant son, Delmer.

References

Unincorporated communities in Pulaski County, Kentucky
Unincorporated communities in Kentucky